Frank Neville Hosband Robinson (13 April 192519 October 1996) was an English physicist.

Neville Robinson was educated at The Leys School in Cambridge, England, and Christ's College, Cambridge, where he read Physics.

Robinson initially worked as a civil servant at the Services Electronic Research Laboratory (SERL) in Baldock, Hertfordshire, under the director Robert Sutton. He then moved to the Clarendon Laboratory at Oxford University to undertake a DPhil doctorate degree in low temperature physics, as a Nuffield Research Fellow (1950–54). With Jim Daniels and Michael Grace, he produced an example of nuclear orientation for the first time. Then in 1951, in the first nuclear cooling experiment, he produced the lowest temperature ever achieved until then at only ten millionths of a degree Kelvin above absolute zero.

Robinson was an English Electric Research Fellow from 1955 to 1959. He was a faculty fellow at Nuffield College, Oxford, from 1958 to 1961, immediately followed by becoming a founding fellow of St Catherine's College, Oxford, where he stayed until his retirement in 1992. He was also a senior research officer at Oxford University during 1959 to 1992, working at the Clarendon Laboratory. During his career, he visited Bell Telephone Laboratories in New Jersey, United States, three times while on sabbatical leave (during 1954–55, 1965–66, and 1973–74).

In 1973, Robinson published the book Macroscopic Electromagnetism, a standard text. His paper Microwave shot noise and minimum noise factor was awarded the Clerk Maxwell Prize in 1954 by the British Institution of Radio Engineers. Importantly, he invented the Robinson oscillator in the field of Nuclear Magnetic Resonance (NMR), which now forms the underlying basis of Magnetic Resonance Imaging (MRI) systems used in many hospitals.

Family
Robinson married Daphne Coulthard in 1952. They had three children including the author Andrew Robinson and the diplomat Vicky Bowman. He died of a heart attack, aged 71, in Colmar, France.

References

External links
 Books by Neville Robinson from Amazon.co.uk

1925 births
1996 deaths
People from West Bromwich
People educated at The Leys School
Alumni of Christ's College, Cambridge
Alumni of Nuffield College, Oxford
English civil servants
English nuclear physicists
Fellows of Nuffield College, Oxford
Fellows of St Catherine's College, Oxford
Scientists at Bell Labs